Wagner Brown (born September 5, 1979) is a Jamaican born professional wrestler, better known by his ring name, SWB or Slyck Wagner Brown. Brown currently wrestles on the Independent circuit in the Northeastern United States. Additionally, SWB was appointed head trainer at Killer Kowalski's school in Boston. Brown also had a longtime association with women's wrestler April Hunter. The duo held tag team titles together in Jersey All Pro Wrestling and Pro-Pain Pro Wrestling. Brown now runs his wrestling training school, Test of Strength, out of East Hartford, Connecticut and runs monthly shows.

Professional wrestling career

Brown began wrestling in 1997, joining Critical Mass Wrestling. He was trained at Killer Kowalski's school. He also learned ring psychology with Tom Howard at UPW. For the first several years of his career, Brown predominantly wrestled in the New England area. He won his first championship in February 2001, New England Championship Wrestling's NECW Championship.

In January 2005, Brown and his partner Johnny Heartbreaker were defeated by Hurricane and Rosey on an episode of World Wrestling Entertainment's Sunday Night Heat.

Brown has also often teamed with female wrestler April Hunter. Together the duo has won Pro-Pain Pro Wrestling (3PW)'s
Tag Team Championship and Jersey All Pro Wrestling (JAPW)'s Tag Team Championship. In 2002, Brown and Hunter began working for NWA Cyberspace. In April 2005, Brown, the current NWA Cyberspace Champion wrestled against Jeff Jarrett for the NWA World Heavyweight Championship. In Cyberspace, Brown had a feud with Rodney Mack. In 2004 made an appearance in Puerto Rico for the International Wrestling Association.

Brown returned to England to wrestle for Superstars of Wrestling in October 2016. Brown runs a professional wrestling academy in East Hartford, Connecticut called Test of Strength Wrestling.

Personal life
Brown was born in Jamaica but grew up in Boston.

Championships and accomplishments

Allegheny Mountain Wrestling Federation
AMWF Heavyweight Championship (1 time)

Assault Championship Wrestling
ACW Heavyweight Championship (1 time)
ACW Great American Championship (2 times)

Big Time Wrestling (Massachusetts)
BTW Tag Team Championship (2 times, current) - with Tre the Smooth Operatin' Gangsta

Chaotic Wrestling
CW New England Championship (1 time)
CW Television Championship (1 time)

Connecticut Wrestling Entertainment
CTWE Heavyweight Championship (1 time)

CyberSpace Wrestling Federation
CSWF Heavyweight Championship (1 time)

Defiant Pro Wrestling
DPW Heavyweight Championship (1 time)

Immortal Championship Wrestling
ICW Heavyweight Championship (1 time)

Jersey All Pro Wrestling
JAPW Heavyweight Championship (1 time)
JAPW Tag Team Championship (1 time) - with April Hunter

Jersey Championship Wrestling
JCW Championship (1 time)

Millennium Wrestling Federation
MWF Heavyweight Championship (3 times)

NWA New England
NWA New England Heavyweight Championship (1 time)
NWA New England Television Championship (1 time)
NWA New England Tag Team Championship (1 time)1 - with Jason Rage and Luis Ortiz

New England Championship Wrestling
NECW Heavyweight Championship (3 times)

New England Pro Wrestling Hall of Fame
Hall of Fame (2015)

Pro-Pain Pro Wrestling
3PW World Heavyweight Championship (1 time)
3PW Tag Team Championship (1 time) - with April Hunter

'Pro Wrestling Illustrated''
PWI ranked him #278 of the 500 best singles wrestlers of the PWI 500 in 2005

Southern Championship Wrestling Florida
SCW Florida Heavyweight Championship (1 time)

Squared Circle Wrestling
2CW Heavyweight Championship (2 times)

Ultimate Wrestling Federation
UWF Heavyweight Championship (1 time)

USA Pro Wrestling
USA Pro Xtreme Championship (1 time)
UPW United States Heavyweight Championship (1 time)

World Star Wrestling
WSW Heavyweight Championship (1 time)
WSW Television Championship (2 times)

World Xtreme Wrestling
WXW Television Championship (1 time)

Xcite Wrestling
Xcite International Championship (1 time)

1Wagner held the NWA New England Tag Team Championship with Jason Rage and Luis Ortiz under the Freebird Rule.

References

Further reading

External links

 

1979 births
Living people
African-American male professional wrestlers
American male professional wrestlers
Jamaican professional wrestlers
21st-century African-American sportspeople
20th-century African-American sportspeople
20th-century professional wrestlers
21st-century professional wrestlers